The 1984–85 Iowa State Cyclones men's basketball team represented Iowa State University during the 1984–85 NCAA Division I men's basketball season. The Cyclones were coached by Johnny Orr, who was in his 5th season. They played their home games at Hilton Coliseum in Ames, Iowa.

They finished the season 21–13, 7–7 in Big Eight play to finish in a tie for third place. The Cyclones advanced to the Big Eight tournament championship game against #4 Oklahoma, falling 73-71. They qualified for the NCAA Tournament as a 13 seed, falling in the first round to 4 seed Ohio State, 75-64.

Roster

Schedule and results 

|-
!colspan=6 style=""|Exhibition

|-
!colspan=6 style=""|Regular Season

|-
!colspan=6 style=""|Big Eight tournament

|-
!colspan=6 style=""|NCAA Tournament

|-

References 

Iowa State Cyclones men's basketball seasons
Iowa State
Iowa State
Iowa State Cyc
Iowa State Cyc